Ignition is the first EP by the hard rock/power metal band Unisonic. It features 2 future album tracks, a demo song and a live version of the Helloween classic "I Want Out". It was released on 27 January 2012.

Track listing

Personnel
 Michael Kiske - Vocals
 Kai Hansen - Guitars
 Mandy Meyer - Guitars
 Dennis Ward - Bass guitar
 Kosta Zafiriou - Drums

References

External links
 Unisonic official website
 EarMusic official website
 'Ignition' - Uber Rock Review

2012 debut EPs
Albums produced by Dennis Ward (musician)